Aleksey Ovchinin
 Sergey Ozhegov (ru)
 Murad Ozdoev
 Valery Olovarenko (ru)
 Magomed Omarov
 Viktor Omelkov (ru)
 Aleksandr Omelyanenko (ru)
 Yuri Onufriyenko
 Aleksandr Oparin (ru)
 Denis Oparin (ru)
 Andrey Orlov (ru)
 Sergey Orlov (lieutenant) (ru)
 Sergey Orlov (captain) (ru)
 Sulom-Bek Oskanov
 Magomed Osmanov (ru)
 Yevgeny Osokin (ru)
 Pavel Ostanin (ru)
 Eduard Ostrovsky (ru)
 Yevgeny Ostroukhov (ru)
 Nikolai Osykovy (ru)
 Viktor Oskin (ru)
 Aleksandr Otrakovsky (ru)
 Aleksey Otcheskikh (ru)
 Oleg Okhrimenko (ru)
 Valery Ocheretny (ru)

References 
 

Heroes O